A sinus venosus atrial septal defect is a type of atrial septal defect primarily associated with the sinus venosus.

They represent 5% of atrial septal defects.

They can occur near the superior vena cava or inferior vena cava, but the former are more common.

They can be associated with anomalous pulmonary venous connection.

References

External links 

Congenital heart defects